James Pederson could refer to: 

Jim Pederson (American football) (1907–1978), American football player
Jim Pederson (businessman and politician) (born 1942), American businessman and former chair of the Arizona Democratic Party

See also
James Pedersen (1868–1944), American businessman and politician